The 1950–1951 St. Francis Terriers men's basketball team represented St. Francis College during the 1950–51 NCAA Division I men's basketball season. The team was coached by Daniel Lynch, who was in his third year at the helm of the St. Francis Terriers. The Terriers played their home games at the Bulter Street Gymnasium in their Cobble Hill, Brooklyn campus and at the II Corps Artillery Armory in Park Slope, Brooklyn.

In the NCIT championship game Ray Rudzinski scored 26 points, Vernon Stokes scored 22 and Roy Reardon scored 21 points en route to victory in Albany, New York.

Roster

Schedule

|-
!colspan=12 style="background:#0038A8; border: 2px solid #CE1126;;color:#FFFFFF;"| Regular Season  

  
   

 

   

   

 

   
  

 

  
  
 
|-
!colspan=12 style="background:#0038A8; border: 2px solid #CE1126;;color:#FFFFFF;"| National Catholic Invitation Tournament

National Catholic Invitation Tournament
The tournament took place at the Albany Armory in Albany, NY from March 13 to March 17.

NBA Draft
At the end of the season two Terriers were drafted by the NBA. Jim Luisi was selected 56th overall by the Boston Celtics. Roy Reardon was selected with the 64th overall pick by the Syracuse Nationals.

References

External links
 St. Francis Terriers men's basketball official website

St. Francis Brooklyn Terriers men's basketball seasons
St. Francis
Saint Francis
Saint Francis